Faustino Quinales (born 12 February 1947) is a Venezuelan boxer. He competed in the men's middleweight event at the 1972 Summer Olympics. At the 1972 Summer Olympics, he lost to Nathaniel Knowles of the Bahamas.

References

1947 births
Living people
Venezuelan male boxers
Olympic boxers of Venezuela
Boxers at the 1972 Summer Olympics
Boxers at the 1971 Pan American Games
Pan American Games medalists in boxing
Pan American Games gold medalists for Venezuela
Place of birth missing (living people)
Middleweight boxers
Medalists at the 1971 Pan American Games
20th-century Venezuelan people
21st-century Venezuelan people